Upton Warren is a village and civil parish in the Wychavon district, in Worcestershire, England.  The village is situated just off the A38 road between Bromsgrove and Droitwich Spa, and on the River Salwarpe.  In the 2001 census, the parish, which also contains the small hamlet of Cooksey Green, had a population of 291.

The village, in the south-east corner of the parish, is situated between two major roads, the M5 motorway to the west and the A38 to the east and south.

East of the village, on the boundary with Dodderhill, is the Worcestershire Wildlife Trust's Christopher Cadbury Wetland Reserve, a nature reserve and a popular location for birdwatching.  The reserve consists of several pools created by subsidence as a result of brine extraction in the area.

Medieval history

Upton Warren
Upton Warren was a Manor, for many years inherited alongside Grafton first in the hands of John de Grafton, then the Staffords, followed by the Talbots and Earls of Shrewsbury.

Little and Great Cooksey
There were two other Manors, Little Cooksey and Great Cooksey, the latter giving its name to the de Cooksey family.

Forest law
The boundaries of Feckenham Forest were extended hugely by Henry II, which encompassed much of North Worcestershire, including Upton Warren. The area was removed from forest law in 1301 in the reign of Henry III, when the boundaries were moved back.

St Michael’s Church
The Church probably existed at the time of the Domesday Book survey, but was rebuilt before 1300, and consecrated that year. The present building largely dates to the 18th century; the chancel being rebuilt in 1724 and the nave in 1798. The tower dates to the late 15th century.

References

External links

 Upton Warren Parish Council

Villages in Worcestershire